Sputnik and Pogrom is a socio-political online publication of Russian nationalist orientation, created by publicist .

History 
According to Yegor Prosvirnin, the name of the publication was born from a joke and is a synthesis of common Russianisms (Russian words that entered without translation into many languages ​​of the world "and became part of the universal semantic field") - satellite and pogrom. Sputnik and Pogrom was launched in 2012 as a community in the Russian social network VKontakte, later a separate website was created. It differed from similar resources in modern design; Sputnik's main product is long texts about historical events and ethnic conflicts. The purpose of the publication is the transformation of Russia into the national state of the Russian people, the transition to European standards and basic principles, among which is called democracy, equality of all before the law, separation of powers and the principle "the state is for Russians, not Russians for the state". Since October 2013, Sputnik and Pogrom has been working on a paid subscription model, the publication did not disclose the number of subscribers.

References

Internet properties established in 2012
Internet properties disestablished in 2018
Russian nationalism
War in Donbas
Internet censorship in Russia